Robert Kulzer is a German film producer, who primarily works with Constantin Film. He is known as the German company's liaison to the Hollywood-based US film industry, beginning with the firm as a script reader and assistant for Bernd Eichinger. He has overseen the company's Resident Evil franchise, with reboots coming for the aforementioned and Wrong Turn.

Filmography
 Manta, Manta, (1991)
 A Girl Called Rosemary, (1996, executive)
 , (1996, executive)
 , (1996, executive)
 It Happened in Broad Daylight, (1997, executive)
 Prince Valiant, (1997, executive)
 Wrongfully Accused, (1998, executive)
 The Calling, (2000, executive)
 Resident Evil, (2002, executive)
 Wrong Turn, (2003)
 , (2004)
 Resident Evil: Apocalypse, (2004, executive)
 The Dark, (2005)
 Skinwalkers, (2006, executive)
 DOA: Dead or Alive, (2006)
 Wrong Turn 2: Dead End, (2007, executive)
 Resident Evil: Extinction, (2007)
 Pandorum, (2009)
 Wrong Turn 3: Left for Dead, (2009, executive)
 Resident Evil: Afterlife, (2010)
 The Three Musketeers, (2011)
 Wrong Turn 4: Bloody Beginnings, (2011, executive)
 Resident Evil: Retribution, (2012)
 Wrong Turn 5: Bloodlines, (2012; executive)
 The Mortal Instruments: City of Bones, (2013)
 Tarzan, (2013)
 Pompeii, (2014)
 Love, Rosie, (2014)
 Wrong Turn 6: Last Resort, (2014; executive)
 Fantastic Four, (2015)
 Resident Evil: The Final Chapter, (2016)
 Polar, (2019)
 The Silence, (2019)
 Shadowhunters, (2019, executive, TV series)
 Black Beauty, (2020)
 Monster Hunter, (2020)
 Wrong Turn, (2021)
 Resident Evil: Welcome to Raccoon City, (2021)

References

German film producers
Year of birth missing (living people)
Living people